The Drive is a television documentary franchise on the Pac-12 Network. American football and men's basketball within the Pac-12 Conference are chronicled by The Drive: Pac-12 Football and The Drive: Pac-12 Basketball, respectively, in a series of weekly 30-minute episodes. The football series debuted in 2013, while its basketball counterpart began in 2015.

Football
In its inaugural season in 2013, The Drive: Pac-12 Football featured the Arizona State Sun Devils and the  California Golden Bears. In its second season, The Drive followed the UCLA Bruins, while 2015 had Utah and Oregon State. 
Starting in 2016, The Drive started to cover all 12 teams in the conference, just like its basketball counterpart, that started in 2015.

The show is patterned after Hard Knocks, an HBO series with behind-the-scenes access to National Football League training camps. Production of The Drive is led by Pac-12 Networks’ Senior Coordinating Producer Michael Tolajian, who won two Emmy Awards as producer for NBA Entertainment and HBO’s Real Sports with Bryant Gumbel. His production team includes Jim Jorden, who helped launch Hard Knocks and has won 16 Emmys.

Basketball
After two seasons of football coverage, The Drive expanded into men's basketball in 2015. Unlike the football series, The Drive: Pac-12 Basketball covers all 12 teams in the conference.  Eight episodes were scheduled for 2015, with two teams featured in each of the six initial shows, followed by coverage of the Pac-12 tournament.

References

External links

2013 American television series debuts
2010s American documentary television series
2010s American reality television series
2020s American documentary television series
2020s American reality television series
Pac-12 Conference men's basketball
Pac-12 Conference football
English-language television shows
American sports television series